The Laaxer Stöckli (also known as Piz Grisch) is a 2,898 metre-high mountain of the Glarus Alps, located on the border between the cantons of Glarus and Graubünden in Eastern Switzerland. It lies approximately halfway between the Vorab and Piz Segnas.

The Laaxer Stöckli belongs to the municipalities of Glarus Süd and Laax. The closest localities are Elm and Flims. The south side is part of the Flims-Laax ski area. A chairlift reaches La Siala at a height of 2,806 metres.

References

External links
 Laaxer Stöckli on Hikr

Mountains of Graubünden
Mountains of Switzerland
Mountains of the Alps
Mountains of the canton of Glarus
Glarus–Graubünden border
Two-thousanders of Switzerland